Christ Apostolic Church (CAC) is the first Aladura Pentecostal church present in Nigeria and other countries. It arose in the first half of the 20th century, in the then-British empire. It was formally established in 1941 after a split from the Apostolic Church which the original Aladura organization (Faith Tabernacle) had invited to Nigeria. Its growth was led by Joseph Ayo Babalola, a road construction driver who became its first General Evangelist.
The revival led by Apostle Joseph Ayo Babalola resulted in thousands burning their traditional fetishes and giving their lives to Christ. This disturbed the colonial authorities, and allegations included witch-hunting and opposition to hospitals and medicine. Babalola was arrested and jailed.

Christ Apostolic Church operates secondary schools and an Entrepreneurial University named after the first General Evangelist, Joseph Ayo Babalola University (JABU) right in Ikeji Arakeji, Osun State in Nigeria. The countries with presence of the Christ Apostolic Church include the 
United States of America, the United Kingdom, Canada, Belgium, Germany, Italy, the Netherlands, the Republic of Ireland, Austria, Australia, South Africa, the 
Ivory Coast, Togo and Chad. Its missionaries headquarter is in Ibadan, Nigeria. The Christ Apostolic Church shows pentecostal features. The number of its members exceeds a million. In the 20th century, it had distance to other Aladura churches. At least in 1999, a dissident faction of the name Christ Apostolic Church existed. Christ Apostolic Church has a major presence among the Yoruba population. It does not have infant baptism. It is in favour of monogamy. Within the Christ Apostolic Church, healing is attempted. Pastor Samuel Olusegun Oladele was inaugurated as the 8th president of Christ Apostolic Church Worldwide on March 20, 2021.

See also
Nigerian sectarian violence
Church of the Lord (Aladura)
Celestial Church of Christ
Eternal Sacred Order of Cherubim and Seraphim
Cherubim and Seraphim Society
St John the Baptist, Kentish Town

References

External links
Website of the Christ Apostolic Church (Inactive)
Current Website of Christ Apostolic Church

Churches in Nigeria
Christian denominations in Ghana
African initiated churches
Christian new religious movements
Pentecostalism in Africa
Christian organizations established in 1941
Religious organizations based in Lagos
1941 establishments in Nigeria